Coleophora dilabens is a moth of the family Coleophoridae. It is found in southern Russia, central Asia and Afghanistan. It occurs in semi-desert biotopes.

Adults are on wing in June and July.

The larvae feed on Salsola orientalis. The first instar larvae live in the carpels of their host plant.

References

dilabens
Moths described in 1982
Moths of Asia